Jairo Manoel Dos Santos,  Vampeta (born 18 July 1984), is a Brazilian born, Italian professional futsal player.

References

External links
UEFA profile

1984 births
Living people
Brazilian emigrants to Italy
Italian men's futsal players
Luparense Calcio a 5 players
Mes Sungun FSC players